Ngadi Chuli (also known as Peak 29, Dakura, Dakum, or Dunapurna) is a high mountain summit in the Mansiri Himal (or Manaslu Himal), also known as the Gurkha Massif, in Nepal. It is flanked by Manaslu to the north and Himalchuli to the south.

Despite its top 20 height, Ngadi Chuli has only been climbed once or twice. The probable first ascent occurred in 1970, when Hiroshi Watanabe and Sherpa Lhakpa Tsering, members of a Japanese expedition, climbed the east ridge and face. They left their camp V, at about 7,500 metres, for a summit attempt. About 70 m below the summit they disappeared out of sight for nearly two hours at 1:15 PM. On their return, after descending a difficult snow ridge, they suffered a fatal fall down an ice wall, from c. 7,600 m nearly down to camp 4 at 6,900 m, where their climbing partners observed their fall. Neither their camera nor Watanabe's ice-ax, to which pennants would have been attached had they reached the summit, survived the fall, so that no conclusive evidence that they reached the summit has ever been found. In order to achieve a confirmed ascent of the mountain, the Japanese organized three more expeditions, in 1974, 1978 and 1982, but these all failed.

The first confirmed ascent was in 1979 by the Polish climbers Ryszard Gajewski and Maciej Pawlikowski via the West buttress, involving some class V rock climbing at great height.

A British Army Mountaineering Association expedition attempted Peak 29 in the post-monsoon 1982 season. Adverse weather and logistical problems caused by the Falklands War, however, prevented the expedition from climbing above .

As of 2014, no further attempts have been made on the mountain since the last Japanese expedition in 1982.

Timeline
 1961 First reconnaissance by Japanese climbers.
 1969 Third Japanese attempt reached 7350 m.
 1970 Probable first ascent, via the east ridge and face.
 1978 Three climbers die in an avalanche during the seventh Japanese attempt.
 1979 First confirmed ascent, by a Polish expedition.

References

Seven-thousanders of the Himalayas
Mountains of the Gandaki Province